Davide D'Appolonia (born 3 December 1993) is an Italian footballer who plays as a forward for A.C.D. Campodarsego in Serie D.

Biography
On 28 August 2014 D'Appolonia and Mauro Vigorito were signed by Vicenza from Venezia. On 1 September D'Appolonia and Miloš Malivojević were signed by Savoia in temporary deals. In summer 2015 he was released after he was excluded from pre-season camp.

References

External links
Venezia official profile 

1993 births
Living people
Footballers from Venice
Association football forwards
Italian footballers
Serie C players
Serie D players
Venezia F.C. players
A.C. Savoia 1908 players
Forlì F.C. players